2022 Thailand Amateur League (Thai: ฟุตบอลไทยแลนด์ อเมเจอร์ลีก ฤดูกาล 2565) is the fifth edition of the tournament after it was in a 3-year absent due to COVID-19 pandemic in Thailand. It is the fourth tier tournament in Thai football league system. There are 253 clubs to participate within 12 subregions.

Tournament format 
The tournament will be divided into 12 sub-regions with 3 stages in each sub-regions.

Group stage: The 253 teams are divided into groups in each upper and lower region. The winners of each group in each region will advance to the knockout stages.

Knockout stage: The winners of each group will compete against each other. Especially the winner will go through to the next round.

Final stage: The winners in the upper and lower regions compete for the winner of the national championship and promoted to the Thai League 3.

Championship stage: Winner in the North, Northeastern, Eastern Region
Western region, Bangkok Metropolitan, Southern region have the right to compete in the national championship

Northern Region

Upper northern subregion

Teams

Group stage 
Group A

Group B

Group C

Group D

Group E

Group F

Group G

Knockout round 
Quarter-finals

Semi-finals

Final round 
The winner upper northern region will compete in the finals in the northern region.

Final

Lower northern subregion

Teams

Group stage 
Group A

Group B

Group C

Group D

Group E

Group F

Knockout round 
Quarter-finals

Semi-finals

Final round
The winner lower northern region will compete in the finals in the northern region.

Final

Final northern region 
The winner between the upper north and the lower north has the right to compete in the national championship round and is to be promoted to the 2022–23 Thai League 3 (T3).

North Eastern Region

Upper northeastern subregion

Teams

Group stage 
Group A

Group B

Group C

Group D

Group E

Group F

Group G

Group H

Group I

Group J

Group K

Group L

Knockout round 

Round of 12

Quarter-finals

Semi-finals

Final round 
The winner upper northeastern region will compete in the finals in the north eastern region.

Final

Lower northeastern subregion

Teams

Group stage 
Group A

Group B

Group C

Group D

Group E

Group F

Group G

Group H

Knockout round 

Quarter-finals

Semi-finals

Final round
The winner lower northeastern region will compete in the finals in the north eastern region.

Final

Eastern Region

Upper eastern subregion

Teams

Group stage 
Group A

Group B

Group C

Knockout round 
Semi-finals

Final round 
The winner upper eastern region will compete in the finals in the eastern region.

Final

Lower eastern subregion

Teams

Group stage 
Group A

Group B

Group C

Group D

Group E

Group F

Knockout round 
Quarter-finals

Semi-finals

Final round 
The winner lower eastern region will compete in the finals in the eastern region.

Final

Final eastern region 
The winner between the upper eastern and the lower eastern has the right to compete in the national championship round and is to be promoted to the 2022–23 Thai League 3 (T3).

Western Region

Upper western subregion

Teams

Group stage 
Group A

Group B

Group C

Group D

Group E

Knockout round 
Quarter-finals

Semi-finals

Final round 
The winner upper western region will compete in the finals in the western region.

Final

Lower western subregion

Teams

Group stage 
Group A

Group B

Group C

Group D

Group E

Group F

Group G

Group H

Knockout round 
Quarter-finals

Semi-finals

Final round 
The winner lower western region will compete in the finals in the western region.

Final

Bangkok Metropolitan Region

Bangkok Metro

Teams

Group stage 
Group A

Group B

Group C

Group D

Group E

Group F

Group G

Group H

Knockout round 
Quarter-finals

Semi-finals

Final round 
The winner bangkok Metro region will compete in the finals in the bangkok metropolitan region.

Final

Metropolitan Region

Teams

Group stage 

Group A

Group B

Group C

Group D

Group E

Group F

Knockout round 
Quarter-finals

Semi-finals

Final round 
The winner metropolitan region will compete in the finals in the bangkok metropolitan region.

Final

Southern Region 
southern region has 19 clubs competing, comprising 8 in the upper south and 11 in the lower south.

Upper southern subregion

Teams

Group stage 
Group A

Group B

Final round 
The winner upper southern region will compete in the finals in the southern region.

Final

Lower southern subregion

Teams

Group stage 
Group A

Group B

Group C

Group D

Knockout round 

Semi-finals

Final round 
The winner lower southern region will compete in the finals in the southern region.

Final

Promoted clubs 
According to FA Thailand's declaration about promoting clubs to the 2022-23 Thai League 3 (T3) by considerate number of participating clubs in each regions, FAT revealed that there will be nine clubs to promote to the next season of T3 League.
 Kongkrailas United (Northern winner)
 Rongseemaechaithanachotiwat Phayao (Northern runner-up)
 Rasisalai United (Northeastern winner)
 Warship United (Eastern winner)
 Samutsakhon City (Bangkok & fields winner)
 Kanchanaburi City (Western winner)
 Lopburi City (Western runner-up)
 Muangtrang United (Southern winner)
 Wiangsa City (Southern runner-up)

References 

Thailand Amateur League seasons
2022 in Asian association football leagues